Action Synthese (or Studio Action Synthese) was a French animation studio and a production company founded in 1998 and folded in 2013. The studio created and produced feature films, TV ads, animated television series and short films. 

They adapted a new version of the stop-motion TV series created by Serge Danot, The Magic Roundabout in computer-animation. The original series attained great success between 1964 and 1977 in France and the United Kingdom. The 3D feature film was distributed in 2005 in Europe and the United States in 2006. The Magic Roundabout new TV series in 3D animation, aimed at preschool children, has been broadcast since 2008 all over Europe (Nickelodeon, ZDF, M6 etc.).

The studio was working on a movie based on the popular novel The Wizard of Oz by L. Frank Baum, a sequel to the 2005 feature film The Magic Roundabout, a film based on Space Goofs called ‘Stupid Invaders’ in collaboration with Xilam, a movie based on Asterix and a TV show called ‘Gaya - A Twins Adventure’, none of which were completed due to Action Synthese going into  compulsory liquidation, leaving The Magic Roundabout the only film they released, along with the reboot series following 2 years later, their other TV adaptation, one of the Children's book Russell the Sheep by Rob Scotton is also likely to have been cancelled.

Films
 2005 – The Magic Roundabout

Television series 

 2008 – The Magic Roundabout (52 x 11 min)
 2010 – The Magic Roundabout season 2  (52 x 11 min)
 2011 – City of Friends season 2 (26 x 11mn and 2 specials of 30mn each)

Cancelled 
 Stupid Invaders
 The Wizard of Oz
 The Magic Roundabout 2
 Gaya - A Twins Adventure
 Obélix
 Russell and Frankie (TV Series)

Short films
 1998 – Antebios
 1999 – Premier domicile connu

External links

French animation studios
Mass media companies established in 1998
Mass media companies disestablished in 2013
Film production companies of France
1998 establishments in France
2013 disestablishments in France